Chinnaravula Pally is a village in Nalgonda district in Telangana, India. It falls under Bibinagar mandal.

References

Villages in Nalgonda district